Moran Mor Ignatius Abded Mshiho II (17 January 1854 – 30 August 1915) was the Patriarch of Antioch, and head of the Syriac Orthodox Church from 1895 until his deposition in 1903.

Early life
Abded Mshiho was born in the village of Qal’at Mara, east of Mardin, in 1854 and at the age of 12, in 1866, he joined the Monastery of Mor Hananyo where he began his education. Seven years later, in 1873, he entered the monastic orders, becoming a monk. In 1875, Abded Mshiho was ordained as priest, and in 1886, he was consecrated as a bishop.

After the death of Patriarch Ignatius Peter IV in 1894, a rivalry began between Abded Mshiho and Gregorius Abded Sattuf, metropolitan bishop of Homs and Hama, to be elected to the patriarchal throne. According to American missionaries operating in Syria at the time, the Ottoman government interfered and intimidated bishops based on the highest bidder. However, in 1895, Abded Mshiho was elected and consecrated patriarch, upon which he assumed the patriarchal name Ignatius.

Patriarch of Antioch

Abded ascended to the patriarchal throne at the onset of a time of great difficulty for the Syriac Orthodox Church as, in October of the same year, demonstrations held by Armenian and Syriac Christians against the Ottoman governor of Amed led to a massacre at the hands of the Muslim population throughout the province and the deaths of two-thirds of Syriac Christians in the Ottoman Empire.

According to Father Armalet, the governor summoned Abded to Amed, where the patriarch witnessed the effects of the massacre first-hand, and according to oral tradition this experience traumatised him, causing Abded to drink upon his return to the patriarchal seat. The oral tradition claims that Abded's drinking led to his deposition by a group of bishops within the church. During the massacres, the village of Qal’at Mara, the birthplace of Abded, was abandoned due to Kurdish attacks.

Abded remained patriarch until his deposition on 10 November 1903, however by who and why is highly controversial within the church. The deposition was the result of an order of prohibition by the rulers of the region on 10 November 1903 and withdrawal of the firman granted to Abded Mshiho upon his ascendency. Supporters of his successor, Ignatius Abded Aloho II, claim that Abded Mshiho had converted to Catholicism and was excommunicated by the Holy Synod as a result. Whereas supporters of Abded Mshiho claim Abded Sattuf bribed the Ottoman Government to issue a firman deposing Abded Mshiho as Patriarch and that he was not excommunicated by the Holy Synod.

Regardless, Abded Sattuf was the Patriarch from 5 August 1906 until his death in 1915 and was based in the Monastery of Mor Marqos in Jerusalem, where he had been bishop. However, Abded Mshiho continued to reside at the Patriarchal residence in the Monastery of Mor Hananyo, raising questions on the likelihood of an excommunication.

Malankara Church

The rivalry between the two patriarchs caused a rift within the church which was exacerbated when Abded Sattuf ordained Indian metropolitan bishops in 1908, creating fear in the Malankara Church that he would attempt to take control of the church, reversing the decisions of the Council of Mulanthuruthy in 1876. As a result, supporters of Abded Mshiho began to call for the appointment of a Maphrian or Catholicos to prevent the Malankara Church coming under Abded Sattuf's control.
 
In 1912, Abded Mshiho was invited to India by the Malankara Metropolitan Geevarghese Mar Dionysius of Vattasseril to discuss with the Malankara Synod who would be appointed Maphrian, a request which he had denied previously. The Synod unanimously voted for Mar Evanios to become Maphrian and on 15 September 1912 Abded Mshiho consecrated Evanios as Baselios Paulose I at St. Mary's Church, Niranam as well as Geevarghese Mar Gregorios, Geevarghese Mar Philoxenos and Yuyakkim Mar Ivanios. He also granted the Episcopal Synod, headed by the Malankara Metropolitan, the authority to consecrate a new Maphrian when the See became vacant.

This led to the permanent division between what would become the Malankara Orthodox Syrian Church who contested Abded Mshiho's deposition, and the Malankara Jacobite Syrian Orthodox Church who supported Abded Aloho II.

Later years
In March 1913 Abded Mshiho returned to Mardin where he spent the remaining years of his life in prayer and peace. He died on 30 August 1915 and was entombed in the Monastery of Mor Hananyo, the traditional resting place of Patriarchs of Antioch. The Malankara Orthodox Syrian Church observes his memorial feast on August 15.[4]

References 

Abded Mshiho II
1915 deaths
19th-century people from the Ottoman Empire
20th-century people from the Ottoman Empire
Assyrians from the Ottoman Empire
19th-century Oriental Orthodox archbishops
20th-century Oriental Orthodox archbishops
Oriental Orthodox bishops in the Ottoman Empire
1854 births